Veretillum is a genus in the family Veretillidae. The genus contains bioluminescent species.

References

Bioluminescent cnidarians
Taxa named by Georges Cuvier
Veretillidae
Octocorallia genera